St Peter & Paul Priory, Ipswich was an Augustinian priory in Ipswich Suffolk, England. By 1130 the Priory occupied a six-acre site north and east of St Peter's Church, Ipswich. Here the secular canons worshipped in the chancel while parishioners were accommodated in the nave.

References

Monasteries in Suffolk
History of Ipswich